Jonathan Óscar Benítez (born 4 September 1991) is an Argentine footballer who plays as a midfielder for Primera División de Chile side Palestino.

References
 
 

1991 births
Living people
Argentine footballers
Association football midfielders
Boca Unidos footballers
Racing de Córdoba footballers
Magallanes footballers
Cobresal footballers
Universidad de Concepción footballers
Coquimbo Unido footballers
Chilean Primera División players
Primera B de Chile players
Argentine expatriate footballers
Argentine expatriate sportspeople in Chile
Expatriate footballers in Chile
People from Corrientes
Sportspeople from Corrientes Province